Thavadi is a small town in Sri Lanka. It is located within Northern Province.

See also
 List of towns in Northern Province, Sri Lanka

External links

Villages in Jaffna District
Valikamam South DS Division